Lancashire Cup may refer to:

 The Lancashire Senior Cup, an association football competition
 The RFL Lancashire Cup, one of the rugby league county cups played from 1905 to 1993
 Lancashire County Cup, a knock-out rugby league competition for teams in the traditional county of Lancashire. It is administered by the British Amateur Rugby League Association (BARLA)
 Lancashire FA Challenge Trophy, English association football competition
 Lancashire Cup (rugby union), a knock-out cup for men's rugby union clubs in the traditional county of Lancashire established in 1971.